Paul Hurst (born 19 December 1948) is a former Australian rules footballer who played for Carlton and Melbourne in the Victorian Football League (VFL) during the 1970s.

Hurst arrived at Carlton from Sandhurst Football Club in the Bendigo Football League and for five seasons played on a half flank and centre, including as a member of Carlton's 1972 premiership team. After receiving a clearance, Hurst moved to Melbourne where he finished his career.

References

Blueseum Biography: Paul Hurst
Holmesby, Russell and Main, Jim (2007). The Encyclopedia of AFL Footballers. 7th ed. Melbourne: Bas Publishing.
Demon Wiki profile

1948 births
Living people
Australian rules footballers from Victoria (Australia)
Carlton Football Club players
Carlton Football Club Premiership players
Melbourne Football Club players
Sandhurst Football Club players
One-time VFL/AFL Premiership players